The 2010  Detroit Lions season was the franchise's 81st season in the NFL. It was Jim Schwartz's second season as head coach. The Lions spent most of the season at the bottom of their division, but with more division wins than the Vikings (whose overall record was the same), the Lions ended up at 3rd place on the final day of the season with a victory over that team. They were eliminated from playoff contention after their Thanksgiving Day loss, extending their postseason drought to 11 seasons, tied with Buffalo for the longest active streak in the NFL. High points of the season included two division wins, the first being a 7–3 victory over the eventual Super Bowl XLV champion Green Bay Packers that snapped a 19-game losing streak against division opponents, and a four-game winning streak which included a victory in Tampa that ended their record 26-game road losing streak. The Lions also sent two players to the 2011 Pro Bowl: wide receiver Calvin Johnson and rookie defensive tackle Ndamukong Suh.

The Lions missed the playoffs for the eleventh straight season, tying a record set between 1971 and 1981. After the Week 13 loss to the Chicago Bears, the Lions hit a low point of 5 wins and 47 losses since their 44-7 win against the Denver Broncos in Week 9 of 2007.

Off-season

Roster changes

Free agents

Releases

Signings

Trades 

On September 4, the Lions traded Dan Gronkowski to Denver for Alphonso Smith.

2010 Draft class 

Denver traded its 2010 fifth-round selection and a 2009 seventh-round selection to Detroit for a 2009 sixth-round selection.

The Lions traded their original seventh-round pick to Buffalo for S Ko Simpson.

The Lions traded their 2010 sixth-round pick and a conditional 2011 seventh-round pick to Atlanta for CB Chris Houston.

The Lions traded a 2010 fifth-round pick (the pick they acquired from Denver) to Cleveland for DT Corey Williams and a 2010 seventh-round pick (214).

The Lions traded seventh-round pick 220 to Philadelphia for their 2011 sixth-round selection.

The Lions traded LB Ernie Sims to Philadelphia, the Broncos received a fifth-round pick from Philadelphia, and the Lions received TE Tony Scheffler and a 2010 seventh-round pick 220 from Denver in a three team trade.

 The Lions traded their second-round pick, their original fourth-round pick and seventh-round pick 214 to Minnesota for their first-round pick and their fourth-round pick.

 The Lions traded their 2010 fifth-round pick and DE Robert Henderson to Seattle for OG Rob Sims and their 2010 seventh-round pick.

 Awarded to the Lions as a compensatory pick.

Undrafted free agents

Staff

Final roster

Schedule

Preseason

Regular season

Note: Intra-division opponents are in bold text.

 Indicates that throwback uniforms were worn.

Standings

Regular season results

Week 1: at Chicago Bears
 
The Lions opened the season at Soldier Field against their NFC North foe the Chicago Bears. The Bears took an early lead in the first quarter with a 20-yard field goal by kicker Robbie Gould. The Lions answered with two consecutive touchdowns by rookie running back Jahvid Best: first a 7-yard run, and later in the second quarter with a 4-yard run. The Bears responded with an 89-yard catch and run touchdown by Matt Forté and later with a 31-yard field goal from Gould just before halftime. The only score of the second half was a 28-yard touchdown catch by Forté (with a failed 2-point conversion), giving the Bears a late lead. Late in the game, quarterback Shaun Hill completed what would have been the game-winning 25-yard touchdown pass to wide receiver Calvin Johnson. A touchdown was initially signaled, but the officials conferred and ruled that Johnson did not "complete the catch during the process of the catch."  The play was reviewed and the ruling on the field of an incomplete pass stood.

With the loss, the Lions started their season 0–1.

Week 2: vs. Philadelphia Eagles

For their home opener, the Lions hosted the Philadelphia Eagles. The Eagles scored first midway through the first quarter with a 45-yard touchdown catch by DeSean Jackson. The Lions responded a few minutes later with a 14-yard touchdown run by Jahvid Best. Later in the second quarter the Lions broke the tie with a 49-yard Jason Hanson field goal. They increased their lead with a 75-yard touchdown catch by Jahvid Best. The Eagles answered with 4 consecutive touchdowns. First a 14-yard run by LeSean McCoy. Next a 9-yard run by Jeremy Maclin just before halftime. Midway through the third, Philadelphia added to their lead with 2 touchdowns by LeSean McCoy. First a 4-yard run, then in the 4th quarter one for 46 yards. The Lions then attempted a comeback with 2 consecutive touchdowns late in the game. First a 2-yard touchdown run by Jahvid Best. Then a 19-yard catch by Calvin Johnson with a 2-point conversion tacked on. The Lions completed an onside kick but turned the ball over on downs.

With the loss, the Lions fell to 0–2 for the 3rd straight season.

Week 3: at Minnesota Vikings

In week 3, the Lions traveled to Minneapolis to take on division rivals the Minnesota Vikings. The Lions took an early lead with a 5-yard touchdown catch by Tony Scheffler. The Vikings tied it up 24-yard catch by Percy Harvin. They then took the lead in the second quarter with a 6-yard run by Adrian Peterson. The Lions responded just before halftime with a 33-yard field goal. Midway through the third quarter the Vikings added to their lead with a 31-yard field goal by Ryan Longwell. A few minutes later they sealed their win with an 80-yard run by Adrian Peterson.

With the loss, the Lions fell to 0–3.

Week 4: at Green Bay Packers

In week 4, the Lions traveled across Lake Michigan to Green Bay, Wisconsin to play division rivals the Green Bay Packers. The Packers started the scoring in the first quarter with a 29-yard TD catch by Donald Driver from Aaron Rodgers. The Lions tied it up in the second quarter with a 23-yard TD catch by Calvin Johnson. The Packers took the lead with a 13-yard catch by Jermichael Finley. They added to their lead 17-yard catch by Greg Jennings. The Lions responded just before halftime with a 21-yard catch by Calvin Johnson. Just after the break, the Packers' Charles Woodson returned an interception for a touchdown. The Lions attempted a comeback with 4 consecutive field goals: from 39 yards and 52 yards in the 3rd quarter, and later from 49 yards and 24 yards in the 4th. With the loss, not only did the Lions fall to 0–4, but it also marked their 19th consecutive loss in Wisconsin.

Week 5: vs. St. Louis Rams

In week 5 the Lions hosted the St. Louis Rams. The Lions started the scoring early with a 30-yard Jason Hanson field goal. The Rams tied it up at the end of the first quarter with a 28-yard field goal by Josh Brown. To start the second quarter, the Lions took the lead with a 105-yard kickoff return by Stefan Logan, the longest touchdown run in the NFL this season. The Lions added to their lead a few minutes later with a 1-yard TD catch by Calvin Johnson. The Rams kicked another 28-yard field goal a few minutes later. The Lions made it 24–6 just before halftime with a 3-yard TD catch by Brandon Pettigrew. The Lions' defense shut out the Rams in the second half. The only score of the third quarter was a 26-yard TD catch by Nate Burleson. In the fourth quarter the Lions kicked 2 field goals: from 48 then from 47. The Lions capped off their victory with a 42-yard interception return TD by Alphonso Smith.  With the win, not only did the Lions improve to 1–4, but it was their largest margin of victory since 1995 and their first win since November 22, 2009.

Week 6: at New York Giants

In week 6, the Lions traveled east to East Rutherford, New Jersey to take on the New York Giants. The Lions took an early lead midway through the first quarter with a 14-yard TD catch by Nate Burleson. The Giants responded at the end of the 1st quarter with a 4-yard TD run by Brandon Jacobs. In the second quarter, the Giants increased their lead with a 33-yard TD catch by Mario Manningham. The Lions responded with a 50-yard field goal just before halftime. Shaun Hill was also injured before halftime and left the game with a broken left forearm. Drew Stanton took over the QB role for the remainder of the game. The only score of the 3rd quarter was a 1-yard TD catch by Travis Beckum of the Giants. The Lions attempted a comeback when Calvin Johnson caught an 87-yard TD. The Giants responded with a 6-yard TD catch by Brandon Jacobs. The Lions ended the scoring with another 50-yard field goal.  With the loss, not only did the Lions fall to 1–5 into their bye week, but it increased their road losing streak to 24, tying the NFL record that the team set from 2001 to 2003.

Week 7: Bye

Week 8: vs. Washington Redskins

In week 8, the Lions hosted a Halloween afternoon contest against the Washington Redskins. Neither team scored in the 1st quarter. The Lions took an early lead in the second quarter with a 13-yard TD catch by Calvin Johnson. The Redskins tied it up with a 6-yard TD catch by Ryan Torain. Washington's Graham Gano kicked 2 field goals just before halftime, from 38 and 46 yards out. The only score of the 3rd quarter was a 2-yard TD catch by Brandon Pettigrew of the Lions. The Redskins took the lead in the 4th quarter with a 5-yard TD run by Keiland Williams; they went for a 2-point conversion and failed, however. The Lions took the lead back with a 7-yard catch by Calvin Johnson; they also failed to complete a 2-point conversion. The Redskins responded with a 96-yard kickoff return for a TD by Brandon Banks; they again failed to complete a 2-point conversion. The Lions retook the lead with a 10-yard TD catch by Calvin Johnson, and completed a 2-point conversion. The Lions added to their lead a few minutes later with a 32-yard field goal by Jason Hanson. The Lions sealed their win with a fumble recovery by Ndamukong Suh which he ran back 17 yards for a touchdown, but the 2-point conversion failed. With the win, not only did the Lions improve to 2–5, but it was the first time since 2007 that the team has won back-to-back home games.

Curiously, this was the Lions' second consecutive blacked-out home game against the Redskins. The Lions had won the previous season's meeting as well.

Week 9: vs. New York Jets

In week 9, the Lions hosted an interconference duel against the New York Jets. The only score of the first quarter was a 10-yard TD catch by the Lions' Brandon Pettigrew. The Jets responded in the second quarter with a 31-yard field goal by Nick Folk and later a 74-yard TD catch by Braylon Edwards just before halftime. The only score of the third quarter was a 1-yard quarterback sneak TD by Matt Stafford of the Lions; however the extra point attempt by defensive lineman Ndamukong Suh (an emergency fill-in for injured kicker Jason Hanson, who got run into on the previous field goal attempt which gave them a fresh set of downs) was no good. Early in the fourth quarter, the Lions added to their lead with a Nate Burleson 2-yard TD catch. The Jets responded late in the quarter with a 1-yard TD quarterback sneak by Mark Sanchez. The Jets kicked a field goal to tie it up just before time expired, forcing overtime. The Jets won the toss and kicked a 30-yard field goal for the win as the Lions fell to 2–6.

Week 10: at Buffalo Bills

In week 10, the Lions traveled east to rainy Orchard Park, New York to take on the Buffalo Bills. Neither team scored in the first quarter. In the second quarter, the Bills got on the board first with a 1-yard run by Fred Jackson. The Lions responded just before halftime with a 25-yard field goal by newly signed kicker Dave Rayner. The only score of the third quarter was a 16-yard TD catch by Fred Jackson of the Bills. The Lions kicked  a 45-yard field goal midway through the fourth. Late in the game, the Lions attempted a comeback with a 20-yard TD catch by Calvin Johnson. They went for a 2-point conversion for the tie but failed. With the loss not only did the Lions fall to 2–7, but it was their 25th consecutive road loss, setting a new league record.

Week 11: at Dallas Cowboys

In week 11, the Lions traveled to Arlington, Texas to play the Dallas Cowboys. The only score of the first quarter was a 1-yard TD catch by Dez Bryant of the Cowboys. In the second quarter the Lions got on the board with a 47-yard field goal, and took the lead with a 9-yard TD catch by Nate Burleson. After halftime, Leonard Davis of the Cowboys committed an offensive holding penalty in his own end zone, giving the Lions a safety. The Cowboys took the lead though with a 97-yard punt return by Bryan McCann, and added to it with a 3-yard catch by Miles Austin. The Lions responded with a 14-yard catch by Calvin Johnson. In the 4th quarter, Miles Austin caught another TD, this time from 4 yards out. Later, Jon Kitna sealed the Cowboys win with a 29-yard TD run. With the loss, not only did the Lions fall to 2–8, but they added to their already record setting 26 game road losing streak.

Week 12: vs. New England Patriots (Thanksgiving Day game)

For their 71st annual Thanksgiving Day game, the Lions hosted the New England Patriots. In a rare occurrence, both teams wore the home versions of their throwback uniforms. The Patriots got on the board first with a 19-yard field goal by Shayne Graham. The Lions took the lead late in the first quarter with a 19-yard TD catch by Calvin Johnson. The Lions added to their lead in the 2nd quarter with a 1-yard run by Maurice Morris. The Patriots responded later in the quarter with a 15-yard run Benjarvus Green-Ellis. The Lions answered just before halftime with a 44-yard field goal.

Detroit area native Kid Rock performed for the halftime show.

The Patriots tied the game early in the 3rd quarter with a 5-yard catch by Wes Welker. The Lions responded a few minutes later with a 1-yard run by Maurice Morris. The Patriots then scored 4 unanswered touchdowns: a 79-yard catch by Deion Branch, then in the 4th quarter a 22-yard catch by the same, then a 16-yard catch by Wes Welker, and finally a 1-yard run by Benjarvus Green-Ellis.

With the loss, the Lions fell to 2–9 and were eliminated from playoff contention.

Week 13: vs. Chicago Bears

In week 13, the Lions hosted a rematch with division rivals the Chicago Bears. The Lions took an early lead when Drew Stanton ran in a 3-yard touchdown. The Bears tied it up near the end of the 1st quarter with a 1-yard run by Chester Taylor. The Lions broke the tie with a 50-yard field goal. The Bears responded with a 14-yard TD run by Matt Forté. The Lions took the lead just before halftime with a 46-yard TD catch by Calvin Johnson. The Lions only points of the 2nd half was a 25-yard field goal by Dave Rayner early in the 3rd quarter. The Bears responded with a 54-yard field goal by Robbie Gould. The Bears took the lead midway through the 4th quarter with a 7-yard TD catch by Brandon Manumaleuna and held off the Lions offense for the remainder of the game for the win.

Week 14: vs. Green Bay Packers

In week 14, the Lions hosted a rematch with division rivals the Green Bay Packers. Neither team scored in the first half. The only points of the 3rd quarter was a 42-yard field goal by Mason Crosby of the Packers. The only score of the 4th quarter was a 13-yard touchdown catch by Will Heller of the Lions to give them the win. With the win, not only did the Lions improve to 3–10, but it was the first time the team beat the Packers since 2005, snapping a 10-game losing streak. It was also their first division win since 2007, snapping a 19-game losing streak.

Week 15: at Tampa Bay Buccaneers

In week 15, the Lions traveled south to Tampa, Florida to play the Tampa Bay Buccaneers. The Lions took an early lead in the 1st quarter with a 10-yard TD catch by Nate Burleson. Tampa Bay tied it up in the second quarter with a 24-yard TD catch by Mike Williams, and later took the lead with a 39-yard TD run by LeGarrette Blount. The Lions answered just before halftime with a 41-yard field goal. The only score of the 3rd quarter was a 10-yard TD run by Maurice Morris of the Lions. Tampa Bay had 2 field goals in the fourth quarter, from 30 then 26 yards out. The Lions tied the game just before the end of regulation with a 28-yard field goal, taking it to overtime. In overtime the Lions got the ball first and kicked a 34-yard field goal for the win. With the win not only did the Lions improve to 4–10, but it broke their record 26-game road losing streak. It was also their first back to back wins since 2007.

Week 16: at Miami Dolphins

In week 16, the Lions flew back to Florida, this time to play the Miami Dolphins. The Lions took an early lead with a 39-yard field goal by Dave Rayner. The Dolphins tied it up with a 40-yard field goal by Dan Carpenter. In the second quarter, the Lions took the lead when Brandon Pettigrew caught a 20-yard touchdown pass. The Dolphins tied it up with a 4-yard rush by Lousaka Polite. Miami took the lead with a 13-yard TD catch by Davone Bess. After halftime, the Lions tied it back up with a 5-yard TD rush by Maurice Morris. The Dolphins responded with a 1-yard TD run by Ronnie Brown. Miami added to their lead with a 28-yard field goal. The Lions then scored 17 unanswered points. First Jahvid Best caught a 53-yard TD pass. Then Dave Rayner kicked a 47-yard field goal. They sealed their win when DeAndre Levy intercepted a Chad Henne pass and ran it back 30 yards for a touchdown. With the win not only did the Lions improve to 5–10, but it was their first back-to-back road victories since 2004, and first three-game winning streak since 2007.

Week 17: vs. Minnesota Vikings

To finish the season, the Lions hosted a rematch with division rivals the Minnesota Vikings. Neither team scored in the first quarter; the Vikings were shut out in the first half. The Lions got on the board midway through the second quarter with a 55-yard field goal by Dave Rayner. They added to their lead with a 7-yard touchdown catch by Nate Burleson just before halftime. After the break, Detroit kicked another field goal, this time from 37 yards out. The Vikings finally got on the board midway through the third quarter when Jared Allen intercepted a Shaun Hill pass and ran it back 36 yards for a touchdown. Early in the fourth quarter, Minnesota added more points with a 27-yard field goal by Ryan Longwell. The Lions responded a few minutes later with a 5-yard TD run by Maurice Morris. The Vikings kicked a 48-yard field goal late in the game, and attempted an onside kick to try to tie it but failed, giving Detroit the win. With the win not only did the Lions finish their season 6–10, but it became their first four-game winning streak since 1999 as they snapped the Vikings' 6-game winning streak against them and also became the first time the team has won back-to-back division rival games since 2007.

Awards and records
Ndamukong Suh
 AP Defensive Rookie of the Year 
 NFL Alumni Defensive Lineman of the Year 
 Pepsi NFL Rookie of the Year 
 Sporting News Rookie of the Year 
 Pro Football Weekly Rookie of the Year 
 PFWA Rookie of the Year

References

External links
 Detroit Lions Official Site

Detroit Lions seasons
Detroit Lions
Detroit Lions